Movies Too is an album by the flugelhornist Franco Ambrosetti which was recorded in 1988 and released on the Enja label.

The album includes music from Rose of Washington Square, Jennifer, Superman, Peter Gunn, Cinderella, What's New Pussycat?, Lady Sings the Blues, and Steppenwolf.

Reception

The Allmusic review by Scott Yanow stated "This second CD of movie themes once again finds flugelhornist Franco Ambrosetti transforming some unpromising themes into jazz ... The inventive arrangements feature excellent solos ... Well worth checking out".

Track listing
 "My Man" (Maurice Yvain, Jacques Charles, Albert Willemetz, Channing Pollock) – 3:48
 "Angel Eyes" (Matt Dennis, Earl Brent) – 10:47
 "Theme from Superman" (John Williams) – 6:36
 "Theme from Peter Gunn" (Henry Mancini) – 3:29
 "Cinderella's Waltz" (Mack David, Al Hoffman, Jerry Livingston) – 2:09
 "What's New Pussycat?" (Burt Bacharach, Hal David) – 6:27
 "God Bless the Child" (Billie Holiday, Arthur Herzog Jr.) – 9:29
 "Steppenwolf" (George Gruntz) – 6:39

Personnel
Franco Ambrosetti – flugelhorn
John Scofield – guitar
Greg Osby – alto saxophone, soprano saxophone
Geri Allen – piano
Michael Formanek – bass
Daniel Humair – drums

References

Franco Ambrosetti albums
1988 albums
Enja Records albums
Albums recorded at Van Gelder Studio